Father and son Alonzo and James D. Green were innocent African-Americans lynched near Round Oak and Wayside, Jones County, Georgia in retaliation for the murder of popular white farmer Silas Hardin Turner on July 4, 1915. A third man, William Bostick was also lynched on this day. None of those killed received a trial.

Background

Alonzo Green worked as an axeman in a local sawmill. He had married Cora in 1902 and had two children James D. (b. abt 1901) and Annie M. (b. abt 1903). White farmer Silas Hardin Turner was a prominent planter in Jones County, Georgia and the son of John D. Turner (1851-1930) and Mattie Hardin (1865-1946).

Lynching

Silas Turner was reportedly attempting to collect a debt from someone in the house of W. H. King when he was allegedly murdered by a Black man on the morning of Sunday, July 4, 1915. A White mob, some 500 men strong, quickly formed and rounded up the local black population. While the Tampa Tribune reported that local Sheriff Etheridge and his deputies hunted for the murderers of Turner. The mob killed father and son Alonzo and James D. Green. To prevent word of the lynching from reaching the outside world the lines of communication were cut.  Sheriff Etheridge was quoted as saying that Alonzo and James Green had nothing to do with the murder of Turner.  After the lynching Sheriff Etheridge brought in three suspects for Turner's murder Will Gordon, Scott Farr and Squire Thomas. 

Alonzo’s wife was eight-months pregnant with their daughter.

Aftermath

In the Jim Crow Era a documented around 675 people lost their lives to lynchings in Georgia. A few of these are listed below:

 

Four years after the Green family lynchings these race riots were one of several incidents of civil unrest that began in the so-called American Red Summer of 1919. Terrorist attacks on black communities and white oppression in over three dozen cities and counties. In most cases, white mobs attacked African American neighborhoods. In some cases, black community groups resisted the attacks, especially in Chicago and Washington DC. Most deaths occurred in rural areas during events like the Elaine Race Riot in Arkansas, where an estimated 100 to 240 black people and 5 white people were killed. Also in 1919 were the Chicago Race Riot and Washington D.C. race riot which killed 38 and 39 people respectively. Both had many more non-fatal injuries and extensive property damage reaching into the millions of dollars.

National memorial 

Featured among other things, is a sculpture by Kwame Akoto-Bamfo of a mother with a chain around her neck and an infant in her arms. On a hill overlooking the sculpture is the Memorial Corridor which displays 805 hanging steel rectangles, each representing the counties in the United States where a documented lynching took place and, for each county, the names of those lynched. For Jones County, Georgia, Alonzo and James Green, William Bostick (July 4, 1915), and John Gilham (September 3, 1918) are memorialized as lynching victims. Even though the members of the Green family stayed in the region the community did not talk about the lynching until recently when they reached out to the National Memorial for help in memorializing the lynching.

Bibliography 
Notes

References

 
 
   
 
 
 

 

 
1915 deaths
1915 murders in the United States
Deaths by firearm in Georgia (U.S. state)
Deaths by person in Georgia (U.S. state)
Lynching deaths in Georgia (U.S. state)
People from Jones County, Georgia 
People murdered in Georgia (U.S. state)
1915 crimes in the United States
1915 in Christianity
1915 in Georgia (U.S. state)
1915 riots in the United States
July 1915 events
Jones County, Georgia
African-American history of Georgia (U.S. state) 
Riots and civil disorder in Georgia (U.S. state)
White American riots in the United States
Racially motivated violence against African Americans 
History of Georgia (U.S. state)